Puget Sound Soccer Academy Rapids (more commonly known as PSSA Rapids) was an American soccer team, founded in 2001. The team was a member of the Pacific Coast Soccer League (PCSL), a recognized Division IV league in the American Soccer Pyramid which features teams from western Canada and the Pacific Northwest region of the United States of America, until 2009.

The team played its home matches in the stadium on the campus of Whatcom Community College in the city of Bellingham, Washington. The team's colors were navy blue and white.

Until 2005 the team competed as Skagit Rapids, and were based in the city of Mount Vernon, Washington, after which they became part of the larger Puget Sound Soccer Academy organisation.

Players

Current roster

Year-by-year

Honors

Competition history

Head coaches
  Todd Stauber 2006–present

Stadia
 Stadium at Whatcom Community College; Bellingham, Washington 2006–present

Average attendance

External links
 PSSA Rapids

Pacific Coast Soccer League teams
Association football clubs established in 2001
Soccer clubs in Washington (state)
2001 establishments in Washington (state)
Association football clubs disestablished in 2009
2009 establishments in Washington (state)